Friday Night in San Francisco is a 1981 live album by Al Di Meola, John McLaughlin and Paco de Lucía. It was described by jazz author and critic Walter Kolosky as "a musical event that could be compared to the Benny Goodman Band's performance at Carnegie Hall in 1938 ... [it] may be considered the most influential of all live acoustic guitar albums".

All the tracks except "Guardian Angel" were recorded live at The Warfield Theatre on 5 December 1980, in San Francisco; "Guardian Angel" was recorded at Minot Sound, in White Plains, New York.

Track listing

Personnel 
Al Di Meola – acoustic steel-string guitar 
John McLaughlin – acoustic nylon-string guitar (played w/ flatpick)
Paco de Lucía – spanish guitar

Chart performance

References

External links
Review at All About Jazz
Review at Jazzbo Notes

Al Di Meola albums
John McLaughlin (musician) live albums
Collaborative albums
Paco de Lucía live albums
1981 live albums